Gnathostoma spinigerum is a parasitic nematode that causes gnathostomiasis in humans, also known as its clinical manifestations are creeping eruption, larva migrans, Yangtze edema, Choko-Fuschu Tua chid and wandering swelling. Gnathostomiasis in animals can be serious, and even fatal. The first described case of gnathostomiasis was in a young tiger that died in the London Zoo in 1835. The larval nematode is acquired by eating raw or undercooked fish and meat.

G. spinigerum has a multi-host life history. The eggs hatch in fresh water and the larvae are eaten by water fleas of the genus Cyclops. The water fleas are in turn eaten by small fish. Eventually, the larvae end up in the stomachs of carnivores, usually cats and dogs. The larva bores through the stomach wall and migrates around in the host's body for about three months before returning to the stomach and attaching itself in the gastric mucosa. It then takes another six months to mature. The eggs are carried in the host's feces, and if they reach fresh water the cycle begins again. As humans are not a normal host for the larva, they do not mature in humans, but can cause various degrees of damage, depending on where the larva wanders in the body.

Description

Species within the genus Gnathostoma are recognized by a bulbous head with a pair of lateral lips surrounding a mouth on the longitudinal axis. The cephalic region is covered by transverse rows of cuticular spines. Internally, the head is divided into four glandular cervical sacs that attach near the esophagus, as well as four hollow spaces called ballonets, each being continuous with a cervical sac via a central canal.

The body is typically pink and is also covered anteriorly with circles of flat spines, which become sparser and single-tipped further toward the end. Behind a bare region that constitutes roughly half of the body length, many small spines can be found on the posterior tip. the four species gnathostomiasis--G. doloresi, G. hispidum, G. nipponicum, and G. spinigerum can cause human –these species are differences in these external appearance and third larvae stage which is helpful for identification.

As a nematode, Gnathostoma spinigerum has cylindrical, a cuticle layer with three main outer layers made of collagen and other compounds. The outer layers are non-cellular and are secreted by the epidermis. The cuticle layer protects the nematodes so they can invade the digestive tracts of animals.

Nematodes have longitudinal muscles along the body wall. The muscles are obliquely arranged in bands. Dorsal, ventral and longitudinal nerve cords are connected to the main body of the muscle.
As a nematode in the group Secernentea, Gnathostoma have specialized tubular excretory system with three canals. The canals are arranged to form an H.

On average, female worms are larger than males by an estimated 4 mm in length and 0.65 mm in width. Respectively, their size ranges from 11 to 54 mm and 11 to 31 mm long. Females are different from males in that they possess only two large papillae around their slightly rounded posterior ends. From the side view, the dorsal outline is rounded, whereas the ventral side appears flat. Males have eight caudal papillae encompassing the anus on their bluntly rounded ends. Characteristic of males is the presence of blunt spicules that play the important reproductive role of holding open the vagina during sperm transfer. These male copulatory organs measure 1.1 mm and 0.4 mm long.

Just before molting into an adult, fourth-stage larvae have eight transverse rows of cephalic hooklets. At this point of development males can easily be differentiated from females based on identifiable sexual organs.
Advanced third-stage larvae bear four rows of hooklets on their head bulbs and measure 3 to 4 mm in length and 0.3 to 0.4 mm wide. The distinctive swollen head morphology, in addition to the four rows of hooklets, already becomes apparent in second-stage larvae.
Eggs have a polar cap at only one end and are laid un-embryonated within pitted shells. Their dimensions are 65-70 µm by 38-40 µm.

Geographic range

Although Gnathostoma spinigerum are considered endemic to Thailand, they are also found in many other countries of Southeast Asia. These nematode parasites have also been reported to be found in Japan, Australia, United States, and Mexico. However, the incidence of infection is rarer outside the Asian continent.

Habitat

Gnathostoma spinigerum normally could be found in wet tropical environments. Larvae can infect many classes of animals. Canine and feline species, and possibly pigs, are determined as c the definitive hosts. In Japan, freshwater fishes, Ophicephalus argus and O. tadianus, are the most important vectors of human gnathostomiasis. In addition to freshwater fishes, domestic duck, Anas platyrhynchus and the domestic chicken Gallus gallus domesticus carry the parasite in Thailand.

Prevention of gnathostomiasis
In a study done in Thailand, researchers have proposed a method of prevention of gnathostomiasis. It states that humans can become infected via eating fresh water fish. For example, a popular dish serving fermented fresh water fish is popular among the women of Thailand, which may explain their higher incidence of the infection. In order to avoid or kill the infective larva living in fish muscle, one must boil the fish first for a minimum of five minutes, placed in a solution of vinegar and 4% acetic acid for a period of 5.5 hours, or just to avoid raw or undercooked fish, always being sure to cook fresh water fish thoroughly.

Treatment of gnathostomiasis 
Laboratory testing on mice treated once or twice daily with albendazole were shown to have a significant reduction in worm count when compared to the untreated mice group. The effective dosage at which albendazole has been shown effective is 90 mg/kg twice a day for 21 straight days. On the other hand, there are other antihelminthic drugs available such as bithionol, thiabendazole, metronidazole, and others, that did not reveal any significant therapeutic effects in experimental G. spinigerum infections.

See also
List of parasites (human)

References

External links 
Tropical Medicine Central Resource - Gnathostomiasis - retrieved March 9, 2006
Animal Diversity Web - Gnathostoma spinigerum - retrieved March 9, 2006

Spirurida
Parasitic nematodes of humans
Parasitic nematodes of vertebrates
Parasitic helminths of fish
Articles containing video clips
Nematodes described in 1889